The 1941 Pacific typhoon season has no official bounds; it ran year-round in 1941, but most tropical cyclones tend to form in the northwestern Pacific Ocean between June and December. These dates conventionally delimit the period of each year when most tropical cyclones form in the northwestern Pacific Ocean. The scope of this article is limited to the Pacific Ocean, north of the equator and west of the international date line. Storms that form east of the date line and north of the equator are called hurricanes; see 1941 Pacific hurricane season.
There were 28 tropical cyclones in the western Pacific in 1941.

Storms

Tropical Storm Two

The system developed east of Taiwan. It moved in a northeastward direction and it finally dissipated on the 5th. It is unknown whether the storm's peak strength was at a strong tropical depression or weak tropical storm. The storm affected the Ryukyu Islands.

Tropical Storm Twenty-five

The storm developed north of Palawan, Philippines on the 20th of October. It moved westwards in the South China Sea and it dissipated two days later.

See also

 List of Pacific typhoon seasons
 1900–1950 South-West Indian Ocean cyclone seasons
 1940s Australian region cyclone seasons
 1940s South Pacific cyclone seasons

References

External links
 USAtoday.com

1940s Pacific typhoon seasons
1941 natural disasters
1941 meteorology
1941 in Asia
1941 in Oceania